Alpine Fire is a 1985 Swiss drama film directed by Fredi M. Murer. It won the Golden Leopard at the 1985 Locarno International Film Festival. The film was selected as the Swiss entry for the Best Foreign Language Film at the 58th Academy Awards, but was not accepted as a nominee.

Plot
A year on an Alpine farm: an older couple have two children, Belli, who wanted to be a teacher until her father pulled her out of school, and the younger Bub, who is deaf and, although he works like a man, mentally childlike.  Belli teaches him as the work his father asks him to do on the farm limits his ability to go to school. Part of his work is quarrying stones to build walls.

In high summer, Bub becomes frustrated when a power mower stops working and throws it over a cliff. Fleeing his father's anger, he takes to sleeping away from the house while continuing to break rocks.

Belli visits him and they sleep together.  By winter, the boy is back in the house and Belli is pregnant.  Soon their parents must know.

Cast
Thomas Nock as Bub
Johanna Lier as Belli
Dorthea Moritz as Mom
Rolf Illig as Father

Reception
It won the Golden Leopard at the 1985 Locarno International Film Festival.

See also
 List of submissions to the 58th Academy Awards for Best Foreign Language Film
 List of Swiss submissions for the Academy Award for Best Foreign Language Film

References

External links

1985 films
1985 drama films
Swiss drama films
Swiss German-language films
Incest in film
Films set in the Alps
Golden Leopard winners
Films about siblings